The Slinger Speedway (also known as Slinger Super Speedway) is a quarter mile paved oval automobile race track with 33-degree banked corners located in Slinger, Wisconsin. The track is billed as the "World's Fastest Quarter Mile Oval."  The current track record was set by Jeff Bloom in a 410 extreme winged sprint car on August 21, 2010 at a time of 9.908 seconds. This is the first lap record under 10 seconds on a quarter mile oval track of any type, breaking Anderson Speedway's 10.28 second lap record. Bloom's lap eclipsed the track record set by USAC midget car driver Tracy Hines on May 17, 2008 at an elapsed time of 10.845 seconds. The lap was the fastest ever midget car lap on an asphalt quarter mile track. He eclipsed the long-standing mark of 11.095 seconds set by Tony Strupp's late model on June 12, 1994.

Track history
The track opened in 1948 and continued with a clay surface through the 1973 season. When it opened for the 1974 season on June 2, track promoter Rollie Heder had the track converted from a flat 1/5 mile dirt track to a 1/4 mile high-banked asphalt track. The track hosted modified and sportsman classes on the new surface. At the end of July 21, 1974, the classes were switched to late models, sportsman, and road runner stocks. As the modified points leader, Larry Ninneman was named the track's modified champion. Joe Shear won two late model special races and another three of five regular season late model races to be named the track's 1974 late model champion over his teammate Dave Watson. Watson won the 1975 late model championship. The track had a paved "X" infield added in the late 1970s, allowing for figure 8 racing at the end of the weekly Sunday night race events.  In 2021, track owner Todd Thelen brought the then all-new Superstar Racing Experience (SRX series) to Slinger Speedway. The July 10, 2021 race was won by Marco Andretti. It was the first time in the track's history that an event was broadcast live on national television (on CBS).

Weekly divisions
There are seven divisions running for points in a weekly program:

Notable drivers to appear at the track

Rich Bickle, Erik Darnell, Matt Kenseth (1991 Late Model Rookie of the Year), Alan Kulwicki (1992 NASCAR Winston Cup Champion), Ryan Mathews (2001 Late Model Rookie of the Year), Robbie Reiser, Joe Shear, Lowell Bennett, Dick Trickle, Dave Watson and Scott Wimmer  competed at Slinger before they moved to NASCAR.

Slinger Nationals
The track's biggest race of the year is the Slinger Nationals. The 200 lap super late model stock car race occurs in the middle of summer. The winner wins the Larry Detjens Memorial Trophy, which was named for the 1980 winner who died in a racing incident at another Wisconsin track later in the season.

The event is usually held on a Tuesday night in order for the nationally and regionally known drivers to participate in the Nationals. NASCAR stars frequently come to the circuit for a one time drive in a local car owner's car in the signature race. Non-local NASCAR drivers frequently race in the event. The 1987 event featured Davey Allison, his father Bobby Allison, Dale Earnhardt, Alan Kulwicki, Mark Martin, Ted Musgrave, and Butch Miller. Kenseth was already a Cup regular when he won his second Nationals in 2002. Three Roush Racing drivers, one from each of the three national series, raced in 2006. The 2007 event had ten drivers with experience in at least one of the three major NASCAR series: Matt Kenseth, Kyle Busch, Erik Darnell, Dick Trickle, Rich Bickle, Scott Wimmer, Chris Wimmer, Lowell Bennett, Kelly Bires, and Brad Mueller. Other notable drivers who have raced in the Slinger Nationals include Neil Bonnett, Harry Gant, Ernie Irvan, Dale Jarrett, Sterling Marlin, Kyle Petty, Rusty Wallace, Ken Schrader and Michael Waltrip. In 2021, by virtue of his win in the Nationals on Tuesday, Luke Fenhaus was granted an automatic invitation to compete in the SRX series race that Saturday as the series' "Local Ringer".

List of Slinger Nationals winners

1980 Larry Detjens
1981 Alan Kulwicki
1982 Dick Trickle
1983 Dick Trickle
1984 Mark Martin
1985 Dick Trickle
1986 John Ziegler
1987 Joe Shear
1988 Butch Miller
1989 Dick Trickle
1990 Joe Shear
1991 Joe Shear
1992 Rich Bickle
1993 Joe Shear
1994 Matt Kenseth
1995 Butch Miller
1996 Rich Bickle
1997 Lowell Bennett
1998 Tony Strupp
1999 Conrad Morgan
2000 Lowell Bennett
2001 David Prunty
2002 Matt Kenseth
2003 Rich Bickle
2004 Lowell Bennett
2005 Nathan Haseleu
2006 Matt Kenseth
2007 Lowell Bennett
2008 Matt Kenseth
2009 Matt Kenseth
2010 Lowell Bennett
2011 Kyle Busch
2012 Matt Kenseth
2013 Rich Bickle
2014 Chris Wimmer
2015 Dennis Prunty
2016 Matt Kenseth
2017 Bubba Pollard
2018 Ty Majeski
2019 Matt Kenseth
2020 Ty Majeski
2021 Luke Fenhaus
2022 William Byron

References

External links

Official Website

Motorsport venues in Wisconsin
Buildings and structures in Washington County, Wisconsin
Tourist attractions in Washington County, Wisconsin
1948 establishments in Wisconsin
Sports venues completed in 1948
Sports in the Milwaukee metropolitan area